Piagge is a frazione of Terre Roveresche in the Province of Pesaro e Urbino in the Italian region Marche, located about  northwest of Ancona and about  south of Pesaro. It was a separate commune until  2017.

References

Former municipalities of the Marche